The Flying Squadron of America was a temperance organization that staged a nationwide campaign to promote the temperance movement in the United States It consisted of three groups of revivalist-like speakers who toured cities across the country between September 30, 1914, and June 6, 1915. The Squadron, organized by former Indiana Governor J. Frank Hanly, was sometimes called Hanly's Flying Squadron.

See also

Temperance organizations

Sources
Indiana State Library

Temperance organizations in the United States